André Brulé ([26 September 1879 – 14 February 1953), was a French theatre and film actor. He created the character Arsène Lupin for the French stage in 1908.

He had a relationship with Ghislaine Dommanget, a French comedy actress, with whom he had a son. She later married Louis II, Prince of Monaco.

Filmography
 Werther (1910): Werther
 Le club des élégants (1912): John Veryle
 Les frères corses  The Corsican Brothers (1917)
 People Who Travel a.k.a. Les gens du voyage (1938): Fernand
 Vidocq (1938): Vidocq
 L' étrange nuit de Noël (1939): Doctor Carter
 Metropolitan (1939): Zoltini
 Le château des quatre obèses (1939)
 Retour de flamme (1943): Mr. De Nogrelles

External links

References

1879 births
1953 deaths
French male film actors
French male stage actors
Male actors from Bordeaux
20th-century French male actors